Helge Payer (born 9 August 1979) is an Austrian former professional footballer who played as a goalkeeper. He played for the Austria national team.

Club career
Payer came through the youth ranks at Rapid Wien to make his professional debut in the 2001–02 season, taking over the first-choice spot from Czech veteran Ladislav Maier. In 2006, he was also named team captain. With Rapid, he won two league titles, also appearing five times in the 2005–06 UEFA Champions League group stage.

On 27 August 2009, he saved an Ashley Young penalty at Villa Park in the UEFA Europa League as Rapid Wien lost to Aston Villa 2–1. Rapid did, however, proceed to the next round via the away goals rule.

International career
Payer made his debut for Austria in a Euro 2004 qualifier in June 2003, against Belarus, coming on as a late substitute for Thomas Mandl.

After becoming a regular starter for the Nationalmannschaft, Payer was included in the 23-man squad for in Euro 2008, but was forced to pull out due to an intestinal thrombosis.

Career statistics

Honours
'''Rapid Wien
 Austrian Bundesliga : 2004-05, 2007-08

References

External links
 
 
Rapid Wien stats 

Austrian FA Website

1979 births
Living people
People from Wels
Footballers from Upper Austria
Austrian footballers
Association football goalkeepers
Austria international footballers
Austria youth international footballers
Austrian Football Bundesliga players
SK Rapid Wien players
AEL Kalloni F.C. players
Austrian expatriate footballers
Austrian expatriate sportspeople in Greece
Expatriate footballers in Greece